Nikola Tachev Parchanov (19 June 1930 – 26 October 2014) was a Bulgarian football goalkeeper who played for Bulgaria in the 1962 FIFA World Cup. He also played for PFC Spartak Pleven, and was part of Bulgaria's squad at the 1960 Summer Olympics, but he did not play in any matches.

References

External links
FIFA profile

1930 births
2014 deaths
Bulgarian footballers
Bulgaria international footballers
Association football goalkeepers
PFC Spartak Pleven players
First Professional Football League (Bulgaria) players
Olympic footballers of Bulgaria
Footballers at the 1960 Summer Olympics
1962 FIFA World Cup players
Sportspeople from Pleven